Jacquith is a surname. Notable people with the surname include:

 Gary Jacquith (born 1948), American ice hockey player
 Jim Jacquith (1898–1960), American football player

See also
Jaquith (disambiguation)